Myomesin-1 is a protein that in humans is encoded by the MYOM1 gene. Myomesin-1 is expressed in muscle cells and functions to stabilize the three-dimensional conformation of the thick filament. Embryonic forms of Myomesin-1 have been detected in dilated cardiomyopathy.

Structure 
Alternatively spliced variants of MYOM1, including EH-myomesin, Skelemin and Myomesin-1 have been identified; with Skelemin having an additional 96 amino acids rich in serine and proline residues. Myomesin-1, like myomesin 2 and titin, is a member of a family of myosin-associated proteins containing structural modules with strong homology to either fibronectin type III (motif I) or immunoglobulin C2 (motif II) domains. Myomesin-1 bears uniqueness within this family in that it has intermediate filament core-like motifs, one near each terminus. Myomesin-1 and Myomesin-2 each have a unique N-terminal region followed by 12 modules of motif I or motif II, in the arrangement II-II-I-I-I-I-I-II-II-II-II-II. The two proteins share 50% sequence identity in this repeat-containing region. The head structure formed by these 2 proteins on one end of the titin string extends into the center of the M band. Alternatively spliced, tissue-specific transcript variants encoding different isoforms have been identified. Myomesin-1 can dimerize in an anti-parallel fashion via its C-terminal region.

Function 
Titin, together with its associated proteins, interconnects the major structure of sarcomeres, the M bands and Z discs. The C-terminal end of the titin string extends into the M line, where it binds tightly to Myomesin-1 and myomesin 2. Skelemin/Myomesin-1 is concentrated at peripheral regions of M-bands, and is postulated to link myofibrils with the intermediate filament cytoskeleton. Skelemin/Myomesin-1 has been detected in the nucleus as well as the cytoskeletal, suggesting that it may play a role in gene expression. Myomesin-1 functions to mediate stretch-induced signaling, and the EH-myomesin splice variant, expressed in embryonic hearts and in dilated cardiomyopathy, can modulate its elasticity.

Clinical Significance
The fetal EH-myomesin alternatively spliced form of MYOM1 has been shown to be reexpressed at an early timepoint in the progression of dilated cardiomyopathy, coincident with isoform switches in titin.

MYOM1 has also been shown to be abnormally spliced in patients with myotonic dystrophy type I; specifically, exon 17a.

Interactions 

Skelemin/Myomesin-1 has been shown to interact with:
ITGB1
ITGB3
ITGA2B
MYH7
Titin
PNKD

References

Further reading